Amadis or Amadis de Gaule (Amadis of Gaul) is a tragédie en musique in a prologue and five acts by Jean-Baptiste Lully to a libretto by Philippe Quinault based on  Nicolas Herberay des Essarts' adaptation of Garci Rodríguez de Montalvo's Amadis de Gaula. It was premiered by the Paris Opera at the Théâtre du Palais-Royal sometime from January 15 to 18, 1684. There was a later production at Versailles without scenery or machines in 1685.

Performance history

Amadis was the first tragédie en musique to be based on chivalric rather than mythological themes; Lully's last three completed operas followed in this course. Louis XIV of France chose the theme. In the dance troupe the principal male dancers were Pierre Beauchamp, Louis-Guillaume Pécour and Lestang, and the principal female dancers were La Fontaine, Carré and Pesan. There were eight revivals of the opera in Paris between 1687 and 1771. Between 1687 and 1729 it was produced in Amsterdam, The Hague, Marseille, Rouen, Brussels, Lunéville, Lyon, and Dijon. Today the most famous aria from Amadis is Amadis' much anthologized monologue from act two, "Bois épais".   At the beginning of the same act Arcabonne sings "Amour, que veux-tu de moy?",  as once did 'every cook in France', according to Le Cerf de la Viéville (Comparaison, 1704–6)

Later developments

The opera went by the title Amadis until 1699 when another opera, Amadis de Grèce, by André Cardinal Destouches appeared. After this, the Lully-Quinault work was billed as Amadis de Gaule. This was also the title of an adaptation of the Quinault libretto with music by Johann Christian Bach, which premiered in Paris in 1779.

Roles

Synopsis
A complex story of love and chivalry depicting the faithful love of Amadis and Oriane, opposed by the sorcerer family of Arcabonne and Arcalaus, with another pair of lovers, Florestan and Corisande, as a subplot.

Recordings
(key: conductor/arcabonne/corisande/oriane/urgande/amadis/arcalaüs/florestan)
Amaducci/Guiot/Eda-Pierre/Manchet/Pietti/Sénéchal/Bastin/Massard, with the Orchestre de Chambre de l’ORTF, live in Paris, Nov. 1974, ORT 3746
Reyne/Ricci/Masset/Laurens/Poul/Geslot/Westphal/Chuberre, with La Simphonie du Marais, live at Les Lucs-sur-Boulogne, July 2006, Accord, 3 CDs
Rousset/Perruche/Bennani/van Wanroij/Tauran/Auvity/Crossley-Mercer/Arnould, with Les Talens Lyriques, live at Versailles, July 2013, Aparté AP 094, 3 CDs

References
Notes

Sources
 Holden, Amanda (2001). The New Penguin Opera Guide. New York: Penguin Putnam. .
 La Gorce, Jérôme de (2001). "Lully. (1) Jean-Baptiste Lully [Lulli, Giovanni Battista] (i)" in Sadie 2001.
 Rosow, Lois (1992). "Amadis" in Sadie 1992, vol. 1, pp. 103–104.
 Sadie, Stanley, editor (1992). The New Grove Dictionary of Opera (4 volumes). London: Macmillan. .
 Sadie, Stanley, editor (2001). The New Grove Dictionary of Music and Musicians, 2nd edition. London: Macmillan.  (hardcover),  (eBook), and Grove Music Online.
 Sawkins, Lionel. "Amadis" in Holden 2001, p. 515.
 Sérié, Pierre (2012). "Plot and libretto", in the book accompanying Didier Talpain's recording of J.C. Bach's Amadis de Gaule (Ediciones Speciales)

External links
 Plot summary on University of North Texas
 

Operas by Jean-Baptiste Lully
Tragédies en musique
French-language operas
Operas
1684 operas
Opera world premieres at the Paris Opera